Shropshire is a district with the status of a unitary authority in the ceremonial county of Shropshire, in the West Midlands region of England. It is named after the historic county of Shropshire. It covers the former districts of Bridgnorth, North Shropshire, Oswestry, Shrewsbury and Atcham and South Shropshire. These were merged into the modern-day unitary authority of Shropshire. The large town of Telford was not affected by this as it has been a unitary authority since 1996 under Telford and Wrekin borough. It contains 188 civil parishes.

History
The district was created on the 1 April 2009, following the merger of the former districts, and upon the formation of Shropshire Council, which replaced the district councils and also Shropshire County Council.

Geography
The district covers the towns of Oswestry, Church Stretton, Craven Arms, Ellesmere, Wem, Whitchurch, Much Wenlock, Shifnal, Bridgnorth, Broseley, Clun, Knighton (part), Bishop's Castle, Cleobury Mortimer, Market Drayton and Shrewsbury.

Governance

The council has been under Conservative control since its creation in 2009, with the most recent elections taken place in 2021.

References

Unitary authority districts of England
Local government districts of Shropshire
NUTS 3 statistical regions of the United Kingdom